A pre-engagement ring, sometimes referred to as a friendship ring or promise ring, is a ring given as a gift to a romantic partner to signify a commitment to a monogamous relationship, often as a precursor to an engagement ring. A heterosexual couple typically has the man presenting a ring or both exchanging rings, though women may present one as well. They may be worn on any finger due to not being as serious as an engagement ring, though they are sometimes worn on a necklace. These rings are typically purchased by those who are too young to get engaged to their partner or by a partner or partners who do not want to rush into marriage. While similar concepts have been employed in the past, the concept of pre-engagement rings came into prominence starting in the 1970s. It gained further prominence in the late 2000s when celebrities began to use pre-engagement rings (as well as purity rings) such as the Jonas Brothers, Selena Gomez, and Priyanka Chopra.

Appearance
Designs of pre-engagement rings may vary, featuring hearts, an entangled design, and other designs. However, any design can be used for a pre-engagement ring. The bands may be made of a variety of materials, including titanium, silver, and gold. Less common inexpensive materials may be used, such as wood, glass, ceramic, bone, and plastic. Birthstones are also commonly used. The ring or rings may be engraved with one or both of the names of those in the relationship, and potentially their nickname(s).

Custom
A pre-engagement ring, sometimes referred to as a friendship ring or promise ring, is given to a romantic partner as a show of a commitment to a monogamous relationship as a precursor to an engagement ring. It is advised to be given only after about six months to a year of a relationship. In a heterosexual couple, the man is typically the one to give the ring, though it is not uncommon for the woman to give as well. Some couples may also exchange pre-engagement rings. They can be worn on any finger, but those symbolizing pre-engagement rings are generally worn on the left ring finger. When a person gets married, if they still have their pre-engagement ring, they may switch the ring to their right ring finger. Because it is not an official engagement, the ring may be worn on any finger. It is also not uncommon for someone to wear a pre-engagement ring on a necklace. They are considered more of a fashion accessory than an engagement or wedding ring are. Costs for pre-engagement rings are almost always cheaper than an engagement ring due to the lower commitment and age of the giver and recipient. Pre-engagement rings are often worn by people who are too young to actually get engaged but want to commit to their relationship. However, they may also be used by couples who do not wish to rush into marriage.

Pre-engagement rings are common in Brazil, and are sometimes worn by couples while they are dating. It is called a commitment ring (or anel de compromisso).

History

Similar concepts to pre-engagement rings have appeared at various points in history. One such example is  posie rings, which were engraved with romantic poems in 16th century England. Another example were acrostic rings, which spelled out a word in gemstones such as "regard" using a ruby, emerald, garnet, amethyst, another ruby, and a diamond. Claddagh rings are another similar kind of ring. The term 'promise ring' entered the "jewelry dictionary" in the 1970s.

Impact
Pre-engagement rings entered prominence in the late 2000s and early 2010s.  One of the reasons for the increased prominence is the use by celebrities, including the Jonas Brothers, Jordin Sparks, Teyana Taylor, and Selena Gomez. Some companies have made franchise-branded pre-engagement rings, such as Disney's Beauty and the Beast-branded promise rings. The rings feature Belle and 'Her Beast' on the man's ring and Beast and 'His Beauty' on the woman's.

Writer Nicole Fabian-Weber mocked the concept of pre-engagement rings in an article about Justin Bieber's gift of a pre-engagement ring to then-girlfriend Selena Gomez. Writer Pascale Day expressed bemusement at the idea of a pre-engagement ring. She expressed confusion as to what it was and commented that 'pre-engagement' is just "being in a relationship." Writer Ana Gabriela Verotti Farah commented that due to the relative newness of the custom in Brazil in 2003, it resulted in trivialization by couples, especially young ones.

References

Rings (jewellery)

it:Promise Ring